George Ratcliffe Woodward (27 December 1848 – 3 March 1934) was an English Anglican priest who wrote mostly religious verse, both original and translated from ancient authors. The best-known of these were written to fit traditional melodies, mainly of the Renaissance. He sometimes harmonised these melodies himself, but usually left this to his frequent collaborator, composer Charles Wood.

Woodward was born at 26 Hamilton Square, Birkenhead, North West England, and educated at Elstree School, then located in Elstree, Hertfordshire, then Harrow School. In 1867 he won a Sayer Scholarship to Gonville and Caius College, Cambridge, graduating in 1872, third class in the Classics Tripos.

On 21 December 1874 he was ordained deacon by the Bishop of London, to serve as Assistant Curate at St Barnabas, Pimlico. In September 1882 he moved to St Mary and All Saints, Little Walsingham with Houghton St Giles, in Norfolk. Woodward played the cello, and the euphonium, sometimes in procession. Other hobbies included bellringing and beekeeping and he also published and printed booklets of his own verse. In 1889 he married Alice Dorothy Lee Warner, at St Barnabas, Pimlico, having moved to Chelmondiston, near Ipswich, in 1888.

In 1893, Woodward published Carols for Christmas-Tide, Series II. His wife Alice died in October 1893, and was buried in Walsingham. In 1894, Woodward published Carols for Easter and Ascension-tide, with one original composition: This joyful Eastertide. In 1894 Woodward resigned as Rector of Chelmondiston, to return to St Barnabas', Pimlico, as Assistant Priest and Precentor.

Woodward helped create the St Barnabas Choral Society, and continued his interests in carols and plainsong. In 1897 he published Hymns and Carols for Christmas-tide, and in 1898 produced Legends of the Saints, and then in 1902 and 1903 The Seven Sleepers of Ephesus and Poemata. In 1899 Woodward left St Barnabas to edit the Cowley Carol Book.

In 1904 Songs of Syon was published, and In 1910 Woodward’s edition of Piae Cantiones, compiled for the Plainsong and Medieval Music Society. In 1917, he jointly wrote The Acathist Hymn of the Holy Orthodox Church in the Original Greek Text and done into English Verse. In 1920, collaborating with Charles Wood, An Italian Carol Book was published. In 1922, Hymns of the Greek Church.

In 1924, Woodward and Wood published A Cambridge Carol Book: Being Fifty-two Songs for Christmas, Easter and Other Seasons. It included "Ding Dong Merrily on High" and "Past Three O'Clock". The same year Woodward received an honorary Lambeth Doctorate in Music.  Woodward died at 48 West Hill, Highgate on 3 March 1934. His interment was at Little Walsingham, Norfolk, on 8 March 1934, at 2 PM.

References

Barnes, John E. George Ratcliffe Woodward, 1848-1934, Priest, Poet and Musician. Norwich: The Canterbury Press, 1995.

External links 
 
 
 
 The Cambridge Carol-Book: Being Fifty-Two Songs for Easter, Christmas, and Other Seasons (with scans of original)
 
 

British beekeepers
20th-century English Anglican priests
19th-century English Anglican priests
English composers
People educated at Harrow School
People educated at Elstree School
Alumni of Gonville and Caius College, Cambridge
1848 births
1934 deaths
People from Birkenhead
People from Walsingham